Elizabeth Bonner (June 9, 1952 – October 9, 1998) was an American long-distance runner. On May 9, 1971, Bonner ran a 3:01:42 marathon time in Philadelphia at the AAU Eastern Regional Championships, breaking the world best set one year earlier by Caroline Walker. On September 19, 1971, she became the first winner of the women's division of the New York City Marathon at the age of 19. Some sources question the validity of Adrienne Beames' 2:46:30 time one month earlier, so Bonner's 2:55:22 performance at New York is frequently credited as the first sub-three hour performance by a woman.

She attended Brandywine College.c/e

In 1994 she was coaching in Louisiana.  She died in Kerrville, Texas in 1998 when she was hit by a truck while biking.

An annual 5K run is held in her name in Arthurdale, West Virginia.

References

External links 
 Beth Bonner - Road Runners Club Hall of Fame (2008 inductee)

1952 births
1998 deaths
American female long-distance runners
American female marathon runners
Track and field athletes from West Virginia
People from Reedsville, West Virginia
New York City Marathon female winners
20th-century American women
20th-century American people